Ulmus parvifolia f. lanceolata, the Chinese elm, is a rare form endemic to South Korea.

Cultivation
Several specimens are grown in Europe, but it is not known to be cultivated in North America or Australasia. There are no known cultivars of this taxon, nor is it known to be available from nurseries.

Accessions
Asia
Chollipo Arboretum, South Korea
Europe
Grange Farm Arboretum, Lincolnshire, UK. Acc. no. 1085.
Hergest Croft Gardens, Herefordshire, UK. One tree, no accession details available. 
Strona Arboretum, University of Life Sciences, Warsaw, Poland.

References

Ulmus
Endemic flora of South Korea
Ulmus articles missing images
Chinese elm cultivar
Forma taxa